The Senate of Trinidad and Tobago is the appointed upper house of the bicameral Parliament of Trinidad and Tobago, along with the President and House of Representatives of Trinidad and Tobago. The Senate currently sits at the Red House. The Senate has 31 members all appointed by the President: 16 Government Senators appointed on the advice of the Prime Minister, 6 Opposition Senators appointed on the advice of the Leader of the Opposition and 9 Independent Senators appointed on the discretion of the President from outstanding persons who represent other sectors of civil society. The presiding officer, the President of the Senate, is elected from among the Senators who are not Ministers or Parliamentary Secretaries. A senator must be at least 25 years old and a citizen of Trinidad and Tobago. The current President of the Senate is Senator Nigel de Freitas. As of 20 April 2021, there are only 13 female senators, or 41.9% and 6 Tobagonian senators or 19.4%. The Senate made history on 15 February 2022 by appointing Jowelle de Souza as an acting opposition senator, thus making her the Caribbean's first and only transgender parliamentarian.

Party affiliation

Leadership

Presiding officers

Majority leadership

Minority leadership

Senators

See also
President of the Senate of Trinidad and Tobago
Parliament of Trinidad and Tobago
House of Representatives of Trinidad and Tobago
Elections in Trinidad and Tobago
List of political parties in Trinidad and Tobago
Politics of Trinidad and Tobago
Tobago House of Assembly

References

Notes

External links
 

Politics of Trinidad and Tobago
Political organisations based in Trinidad and Tobago
Government of Trinidad and Tobago
Trinidad and Tobago